The United States Air Force's 8th Air Support Operations Squadron (8 ASOS) was a combat support unit located at Aviano AB, Italy. The 8 ASOS provided Tactical Command and Control of air power assets to the Joint Forces Air Component Commander and Joint Forces Land Component Commander for combat operations.  Due to budget constraints, the 8 ASOS was disbanded in 2013.

References

Air support operations squadrons of the United States Air Force